Rwekunye is a settlement in Kiryandongo District in the Western Region of Uganda.

Location
It is located immediately west of the larger area of Masindi Port, along the Rwekunye–Apac–Aduku–Lira–Kitgum–Musingo Road. The coordinates of Rwekunye are 1°42'39.0"N, 32°01'44.0"E (Latitude:1.710833; Longitude:32.028889).

Overview

Points of interest
The town has additional points of interest, including the following:
 the Rwekunye–Apac–Aduku–Lira–Kitgum–Musingo Road meets the Kampala–Gulu Highway in Rwekunye
 Rwekunye central market

See also
Bunyoro sub-region
List of roads in Uganda
List of cities and towns in Uganda

References

External links
Oil Sparks Roads Upgrade

Populated places in Western Region, Uganda
Kiryandongo District